The Erovnuli Liga is the top division of professional football in Georgia. Since 1990, it has been organized by the Professional Football League of Georgia and Georgian Football Federation. From 1927 to 1989, the competition was held as a regional tournament within the Soviet Union. From 2017, the Erovnuli Liga switched to a spring-autumn system, with only 10 clubs in the top flight.

Format
Below is a complete record of how many teams have played in each season throughout the league's history:

UEFA Country Ranking
39   (39)  Premier League of Bosnia and Herzegovina (6.500)
40   (40)  Erovnuli Liga (6.375)

41   (41)  Latvian Higher League (6.125)
42   (42)  Macedonian First Football League (5.625)
43   (43)  Meistriliiga (5.250)

Champions

Soviet era

as Georgian SSR
1927: Batumi XI
1928: Tbilisi XI
1929–35: Not played
1936: ZII Tbilisi
1937: FC Lokomotivi Tbilisi
1938: FC Dinamo Batumi
1939: Nauka Tbilisi
1940: FC Dinamo Batumi
1941–42: Not played
1943: ODKA Tbilisi
1944: Not played
1945: FC Lokomotivi Tbilisi
1946: FC Dinamo Kutaisi
1947: FC Dinamo Sokhumi
1948: FC Dinamo Sokhumi
1949: FC Torpedo Kutaisi
1950: TODO Tbilisi
1951: TODO Tbilisi
1952: TTU Tbilisi
1953: TTU Tbilisi
1954: TTU Tbilisi
1955: Dinamo Kutaisi
1956: FC Lokomotivi Tbilisi
1957: TTU Tbilisi
1958: TTU Tbilisi
1959: Metallurg Rustavi
1960: Imereti Kutaisi
1961: Guria Lanchkhuti
1962: Imereti Kutaisi
1963: Imereti Kutaisi
1964: IngurGES Zugdidi
1965: Tolia Tbilisi
1966: Guria Lanchkhuti
1967: Mertskhali Makharadze
1968: SKA Tbilisi
1969: Sulori Vani
1970: SKIF Tbilisi
1971: Guria Lanchkhuti
1972: Lokomotivi Samtredia
1973: Dinamo Zugdidi
1974: Metallurg Rustavi
1975: Magaroeli Chiatura
1976: SKIF Tbilisi
1977: Mziuri Gali
1978: Kolheti Poti
1979: Metallurg Rustavi
1980: Meshakhte Tkibuli
1981: Meshakhte Tkibuli
1982: Mertskhali Makharadze
1983: Samgurali Tskhaltubo
1984: Metallurg Rustavi
1985: Shadrevani-83 Tskhaltubo
1986: Shevardeni-1906 Tbilisi
1987: Mertskhali Makharadze
1988: Kolkheti Khobi
1989: Shadrevani-83 Tskhaltubo

Post-independence
Key

As Umaglesi Liga

As Erovnuli Liga

Performance by club

Top scorers

References

External links
 
Erovnuli Liga on Soccerway
Georgia - List of Champions, RSSSF.com
Erovnuli Liga on Hotscore

 
Football competitions in Georgia (country)
1
Georgia
Sports leagues established in 1990
1990 establishments in Georgia (country)